The Trinkat-class patrol vessels of the Indian Navy were designed and constructed by Garden Reach Shipbuilders and Engineers.

Role
The patrol vessels carry out fisheries protection, anti-poaching, counter-insurgency and search-and-rescue operations in coastal areas and in the exclusive economic zone. The vessels of the "Trinkat" class are named after islands from the Andaman and Nicobar Islands or the Lakshadweep Islands.

Ships in class

Replacements
While the older INS Tarasa and INS Tarmugli were transferred to Seychelles Coast Guard and INS Tillanchang was transferred to Maldivian Coast Guard, newer ships bearing the original names were launched starting in 2016. The new ships have also been designed and constructed by Garden Reach Shipbuilders and Engineers as s. The new , the follow-on water jet fast attack craft was launched in Kolkata on 30 June 2016. The new  another water jet-powered fast attack craft was commissioned at Karwar on 9 March 2017. The new  was commissioned at Vizag on 23 May 2016. These ships are similar in design and armament to the Trinkat-class ships that were transferred to Maldives and Seychelles, with added capabilities for enhanced endurance.

See also 
Action of 30 March 2010
List of active Indian Navy ships

References

 
Ships built in India
Patrol boat classes